Venus Observed is a play in blank verse by the English dramatist and poet Christopher Fry. The play concerns a Duke who decides to remarry for a third time. He gets his son Edgar to pick the bride. The Duke likes Perpetua but Edgar wants her for himself.

Productions 
It was first performed on 18 January 1950 at the St James's Theatre, London, and ran for 229 performances with the following cast:

The Duke of Altair  – Laurence Olivier
Edgar, his son  – Denholm Elliott
Herbert Reedbeck, his agent  – George Relph
Dominic, Reedbeck's son  – Robert Beaumont
Rosabel Fleming  – Valerie Taylor
Jessie Dill  – Brenda de Banzie
Captain Fox Reddleman, the Duke's butler – Fred Johnson
Bates, the Duke's footman  – Thomas Heathcote
Hilda Taylor-Snell  – Rachel Kempson
Perpetua, Reedbeck's daughter  – Heather Stannard
Director – Laurence Olivier 
Set designer – Roger Furse 
Composer – Herbert Menges 
Costume designer – Margaret Furse

Scenes: 
The Observatory Room at Stellmere Park, the Duke's mansion
The Temple of the Ancient Virtues, Stellmere Park
Olivier's production opened on 13 February 1952 at the New Century Theatre on Broadway, where it ran for 86 performances. A new cast was headed by Rex Harrison as the Duke and his then wife Lilli Palmer as Perpetua.

Adaptations

1957 British TV adaptation
The play was broadcast on British TV as an ITV Play of the Week in 1957, with John Robinson as the Duke and Frances Rowe as Rosabel.

1960 Australian TV adaptation

The play was adapted for Australian TV in 1960. It was directed by Alan Burke who had directed a stage production at the Arrow Theatre in Melbourne in 1952.

The cast included Walter Sullivan as Duke of Altair, Rachel Lloyd as Perpetua, David Bluford as Edgar, Jacqueline Kott as Rosabel, Gwen Plumb as Jessie, Ria Sohier as Hilda, Hugh Stewart, John Dennis, John Gray and James Elliott. It was the Australian television debut of English actor Rachel Lloyd, although she had been in two episodes of Whiplash. The sets were by Geoffrey Wedlock.

The critic for The Sydney Morning Herald called Venus Observed a "a pleasantly competent piece of work... a production rich in setting, with exactly the right kind of faded spaciousness you would expect in such a household.... It will be good to see more productions of this calibre.

References

External links
 
Venus Observed 1960 Australian TV production at IMDb

1950 plays
Plays by Christopher Fry